Heinz Schattner (20 June 1912 – 2 February 1954) was a German weightlifter. He competed in the super heavyweight category at the 1952 Summer Olympics and finished in fourth place. He won three consecutive European titles between 1951 and 1953 and finished third at the 1937 World Weightlifting Championships.

References

1912 births
1954 deaths
Sportspeople from Gdańsk
German male weightlifters
Olympic weightlifters of Germany
Weightlifters at the 1952 Summer Olympics
People from West Prussia